Alexandra Chambon (born 2 August 2000) is a French rugby union player who plays for FC Grenoble Amazones and the France women's national rugby union team.

Career
A scrum half from Montmélian, Alexandra Champon received her first international cap in November 2021 in a 46-3 win against South Africa in Vannes. Her second cap came at the Stade des Alpes in Grenoble in the Six Nations.

She was named in France's team for the delayed 2021 Rugby World Cup in New Zealand.  Chambon reflected that if the tournament had not been delayed she would have not been part of the squad and that France were enjoying their status as relative outsiders compared to the tournament favourites.

References

2000 births
Living people
French female rugby union players